The 2020–21 season was the first in the history of Macarthur Football Club. The club competed in the A-League for the first time.

Players

Transfers

Transfers in

Contracts extensions

Pre-season and friendlies

Competitions

Overall record

A-League

League table

Results summary

Results by round

Matches

Finals series

Statistics

Appearances and goals
Players with no appearances not included in the list.

Goalscorers

Disciplinary record

Clean sheets

References

Macarthur FC seasons
Macarthur FC